Albericus or Alberico de Rosate (or Rosciate; c. 1290 – 1354 or 1360) was an Italian jurist.

Early life and education 

He was born in the village of Rosate (Rosciate) in the district of Bergamo, and was of humble parentage. He studied law under Oldradus de Ponte and Riccardus Malumbra at the University of Padua, where he gained the degree of Doctor, without, however, becoming a teacher.

Albericus also studied under Ranieri di Forlì and had contact with Bartolus de Saxoferrato. In the 1310s he returned to Bergamo, where he was a lawyer and took part in various public affairs. He was employed in particular by Galeazzo II Visconti of Milan, and after Galeazzo's death by Luchino Visconti and the latter's brother John, Bishop of Novara. In 1331 and 1333 he was involved in reforming Bergamo's civil statutes, and he was sent several times (in 1335, 1337–38 and 1340–41) as ambassador to Pope Benedict XII's court at Avignon.

Later years 
In his later years Albericus devoted himself especially to scientific literary labours. The last certain report concerning his life belongs to the year 1350, when he went with his sons to Rome to attend the jubilee.

He died in Bergamo in the late 1350s.

Works
His writings won him a high reputation, especially among practical jurists. Special mention should be made of his commentaries on the Digests and the Codex, which were often printed later, as at Lyon (1517, 1545–48); the "Opus Statutorum" (Como 1477; Milan, 1511); and the Dictionarium, a collection of maxims of law as well as a dictionary, which was often reprinted.

Editions 

Quaestiones statutorum
 
Commentaria
 
 
 
 
 
 
 
 
 
Dictionarium iuris tam civilis quam canonici
 
 
Codice Grumelli
De accenti, breve trattato grammaticale
De aspiratione, breve trattato grammaticale
De orthographia, breve trattato grammaticale
De regulis iuris.

References

 The original article is available here.

External links
 
Complete works and editions by Albericus de Rosate at ParalipomenaIuris

1290 births
1350s deaths
People from the Province of Bergamo
14th-century Italian jurists